Sincerely Me is the debut studio album and by English musician James Cottriall, released on 15 October 2010 by Pate Records. The album includes the singles "Unbreakable", "So Nice" and "Goodbyes". It peaked at number 27 on the Austrian Albums Chart.

Singles
"Unbreakable" was released as the album's lead single on 9 April 2010. It peaked at number 16 on the Austrian Singles Chart. "So Nice" was released as the album's second single on 6 August 2010. It peaked at number 24 on the Austrian Singles Chart. "Goodbyes" was released as the album's second single on 10 December 2010. It peaked at number 72 on the Austrian Singles Chart.

Track listing

Chart performance

Release history

References

2010 debut albums
James Cottriall albums